Mario Rapisardi (25 February 1844, in Catania – 4 January 1912, in Catania) was an Italian poet, supporter of Risorgimento and member of the Scapigliatura (definition but refused).

Life
As a boy, he was taught "grammar, rhetoric and the Latin language" by two priests and "a psicontologico mixture that he thought was philosophy" by a friar.  To please his father, he then unwillingly took the usual course in jurisprudence, but never wanted to take the laurea in that or any other faculty.  He wrote at this time "there is nothing noteworthy in my life, unless it is this, that - for good or ill - it formed me, destroying the wretched and false education I had received [up to then] and instructing and educating me, in my own way, to be outside whatever school, whatever sect, scornful of systems and prejudices".

He began his poetic career at fourteen with an ode to Saint Agatha, in which he dared to recommend the freedom of his fatherland (then under the Bourbon regime), and in 1863 published a volume of verses under the title Canti.  In 1865 he came to Florence for the first time, returning there often later in his life.  There he got to know Giovanni Prati, Niccolò Tommaseo, Atto Vannucci, Pietro Fanfani, Andrea Maffei, Giuseppe Regaldi, Erminia, Arnaldo Fusinato, Francesco Dall'Ongaro, Terenzio Mamiani and other "illustri e buoni", as he later called them.  Also in Florence he published his La Palingenesi in 1868, recommending a religious revival for humanity.  It got good reviews, and Victor Hugo read it and wrote to Rapisardi, saying "...[it is a] noble poem.  You are a forerunner".

In 1870 he received a teaching post at the University of Catania.  Don Pedro II, emperor of Brazil, attended one of his lessons in 1876 and recommended him to the last book of Dante's De Monarchia.  Rapisardi was made ordinario of Italian literature at the university in 1878, and presented the inaugural lecture of the academic year there in 1879.  His topic was "The new scientific concept", one he saw as brave seeing as he was delivering the lecture "before the authorities, in this country and on this solemn occasion".

In 1881 he began a controversy with Giosuè Carducci.  In 1885 the Florentine Amelia Poniatowski Sabernich became his lover, remaining so until his death. In 1886, he was in Rome on the board to discuss universities, and wrote to her "Di Roma non mi piacciono che alcuni ruderi, pochi, non tutti quelli che guardano a bocca aperta i forestieri; le chiese splendide tutte mi fanno rabbia: sono reggie, non tempi. (O Santa Maria del Fiore! Quella sì che è la casa del Dio Ignoto, e tale da fare raccogliere l'animo più incredulo in meditazioni sublimi)". He refused the nomination offered to him by the constituency of Trapani well 6200 votes, a figure so extraordinary, blaming his failing health, the failure of his studies and the nature "devoid of political stores."
  
As a professor in Catania, he wrote a poetic history of humanity called Luzifero. Also wrote Giobbe and Atlantide. He was a Mason (as was Carducci) and a chapter of the higher degrees is named after him.

In 1894 he was attacked by some socialists for advising calm during the famous "moti di Sicilia", to which he replied that such events seemed "untimely" and lacked "a common programme" and effective leaders, and that he had been made a "moderator" not a "peacemaker".  In 1897 he answered an invitation to collaborate on the magazine L'Università, excusing himself as not having enough time or the right attitude to write for the newspapers and trying to dissuade the editors from getting him to contribute anything political in character.  In 1905 a proposal to dismiss him from the university caused protests from students in several Italian universities, and in 1909 he replied to an invitation by Filippo Tommaso Marinetti by writing that "the obligation on poets is not to found new schools or aggrandize the ancients; his duty is to express things as they are and represent reality as he sees and feels it, with complete sincerity, with heat and with the colour of his soul (...)

He died in Catania in 1912, and Catania went into official mourning for three days, with his funeral attracting over 150,000 people (including official representatives sent from Tunisia to attend).  However, due to opposition from the church authorities, his body remained unburied in a storage area at the town cemetery for ten days.

Works
1858 - Ode to sant'Agata
1863 - Canti, a volume of verses
1872, Pisa - Le ricordanze, collection of lyric verses
1875, Florence - Catullo e Lesbia
1877, Milan - Lucifero, praising Rationalism's triumph over Transcendence.
1879, Milan - Translation of Lucretius's De rerum natura
1885, Catania - Giustizia, collection of social-reform poetry.
1884, Catania - Giobbe, poem expressing the accents of human pain.
1887, Catania - Le poesie religiose, advocating religion of a pantheistic mould.
1888 - Duetto, a social-reform poem for which he was tried by the magistrate of Venice.
1889, Naples - Translation of the works of Catullus.
1892, Palermo - Translation of Percy Bysshe Shelley's Prometheus Unbound.
1894 - The poem Atlantide, a biting satire and work of caricature about the literati of the day. 
1897 - Translation of the Odes of Horace.
1902 - L'asceta and other poems.

Bibliography
 "Mario Rapisardi", atti del convegno a cura di Sarah Zappulla Muscarà, Giuseppe Maimone Editore, Catania 1991

Other projects
  Italian WikiSource has material related to Mario Rapisardi
  Italian WikiQuote has material related to Mario Rapisardi

Notes

External links
 
 
 Letter to Francesco Paolo Frontini, from Mario Rapisardi, on the occasion of the publication of the Romanza Lauda di Suora (1889)
 Letter to Francesco Paolo Frontini, from Mario Rapisardi (1906)
 Epitaph of Mario Rapisardi
 Works citing Mario Rapisardi
 Francesco Paolo Frontini and Mario Rapisardi
 Life and works of Mario Rapisardi

1844 births
1912 deaths
Italian poets
Italian republicans
Italian male poets
Italian people of the Italian unification
Writers from Catania
Sicilian-language poets